Scratched is a 1916 American short film directed by Fred Kelsey, scenario by Douglas Bronston, starring Earle Page, Irene Hunt, and Jean Hersholt.

References

1916 films
American silent short films
American black-and-white films
1916 short films
1910s American films